Paričjak is a settlement in the Municipality of Radenci in northeastern Slovenia. It lies along the road from Radenci to Kapelski Vrh.

There is a chapel-shrine with a belfry in the settlement. It was built in the early 20th century.

References

External links
Paričjak on Geopedia

Populated places in the Municipality of Radenci